Dhanekhali Assembly constituency is an assembly constituency in Hooghly district in the Indian state of Bengal. It is reserved for scheduled castes.

Overview
As per orders of the Delimitation Commission, No. 197 Dhaniakhali Assembly constituency (SC) is composed of the following: Belmuri, Bhastara, Dashghara I, Dashghara II, Dhaniakhali I, Dhaniakhali II, Gurap, Gurbari I, Gurbari II, Khajurdaha Milki, Mandra, Somaspur I and Somaspur II gram panchayats of Dhaniakhali community development block, and Babnan, Dadpur, Makalpur and Satithan gram panchayats of Polba-Dadpur community development block.

Dhanekhali Assembly constituency (SC) is part of No. 28 Hooghly (Lok Sabha constituency).

Members of Legislative Assembly

Election results

2021

2016

2011

 
  

 

.# Swing calculated on Congress+Trinamool Congress vote percentages taken together in 2006.

1977-2006
In the 2006 state assembly elections, Ajit Patra of Forward Bloc won the Dhaniakhali assembly seat defeating Jitendra Nath Sarkar of Trinamool Congress. Contests in most years were multi cornered but only winners and runners are being mentioned. Kripa Sindu Saha of Forward Bloc defeated Asima Patra representing Trinamool Congress in 2001 and Congress in 1996 and 1991, and Kashinath Patra of Congress in 1987, 1982  and 1977.

1951-1972
Kashi Nath Patra of Congress won in 1972. Kashi Nath Roy of CPI(M) won in 1971. Kripa Sindhu Saha of Forward Bloc won in 1969 and 1967. Birendra Chaudhury of Congress won in 1962. In 1957 Dhaniakhali was a double seat. It was won by Radha Nath Das and D.N.Mukherjee, both of Congress. In independent India's first election in 1951 the Dhaniakhali seat was won by Dhirendra Narayan Mukherjee of Congress.

References

Assembly constituencies of West Bengal
Politics of Hooghly district